Sean Lewis Hill is an American neuroscientist, Professor at the University of Toronto Faculty of Medicine, and inaugural Scientific Director of the Krembil Centre for Neuroinformatics in Toronto, Canada. He was formerly co-director of the Blue Brain Project at the École Polytechnique Fédérale de Lausanne located on the Campus Biotech in Geneva, Switzerland. He is known for the development of large-scale computational models of brain circuitry and neuroinformatics.

Early life and education
Hill was born in New Jersey, raised in Warren, Maine and attended Camden-Rockport High School. He graduated from Hampshire College with a degree in Computational Neuroscience and obtained his PhD from the University of Lausanne, Switzerland.

Career
After working with Gerald Edelman and Giulio Tononi at The Neurosciences Institute in San Diego, Hill continued his postdoctoral research at the University of Wisconsin–Madison. In 2006, Hill joined the Computational Biology group at the IBM Thomas J. Watson Research Center. There he served as Project Manager for Computational Neuroscience on the Blue Brain Project from 2006 to 2008. He subsequently joined the EPFL Blue Brain team. Hill served as the executive director of the International Neuroinformatics Coordinating Facility from 2011 to 2013 and as its Scientific Director from 2013 to 2016. He developed the core strategy and design of the neuroinformatics infrastructure of the EU Human Brain Project, led its development during its start-up phase, and in 2014 was co-director of the project.

As of September, 2017, Hill has been named inaugural Director of the Krembil Centre for Neuroinformatics at the Centre for Addiction and Mental Health in Toronto, Canada. The center applies machine learning and artificial intelligence techniques, as well as multi scale modeling of the brain to the understanding of mental health disorders

Prior to this, Hill served as co-director of Blue Brain, where he led the Neuroinformatics Division of Blue Brain. In this role, he directed the development of Blue Brain Nexus, an open-source data integration, management and search platform adopted by both the Blue Brain Project and Human Brain Project.

Hill has developed a number of large-scale brain models and simulations, including the first large-scale model of the visual thalamocortical system of the cat which accurately replicates multi-scale electrophysiological phenomena during wakefulness and sleep. He has also co-led the Blue Brain's efforts to create digital reconstructions of neocortical microcircuitry.

He serves on the advisory or management boards of several clinical and neuroinformatics initiatives including the Ontario Brain Institute and a large-scale traumatic brain injury study, CENTER-TBI.

Hill is author of more than 80 peer reviewed publications, multiple patents, and has given talks around the world on the topics of neuroinformatics, brain modeling and simulation, and on the cellular and synaptic mechanisms of conscious and unconscious brain states.

An advocate of global collaboration on data sharing in brain research, Hill has actively worked with brain projects around the world to identify potential areas of collaboration and interaction. He has been quoted as saying "It takes the world to understand the brain."

Hill has appeared in the press and in many documentaries about the brain, including on ARTE and the PBS documentary The Brain with David Eagleman, and has been interviewed in print  and on radio and television programs including the CBC, CNN, and Bloomberg.

References

External links
 Krembil Centre for Neuroinformatics website
 Profile at Blue Brain Project website retrieved on 21 September 2021
 Human Brain Project
 Sean Hill at EPFL. retrieved on 28 September 2016
 or http://hill-lab.org Laboratory for the Neural Basis of Brain States  retrieved on 7 November 2016
 INCF  retrieved on 7 November 2016

University of Lausanne alumni
American neuroscientists
1969 births
Living people
American expatriate academics
Hampshire College alumni
American expatriates in Switzerland
Neuroinformatics
Computational neuroscience
People from Warren, Maine